Maxwell G. Towle (September 9, 1889 – April 27, 1969) was an American football player and coach. He served as the head football coach at Hastings College in Hastings, Nebraska from 1914 to 1915. Towle was the starting quarterback at the University of Nebraska from 1912 to 1913, leading the 1913 Cornhuskers to an undefeated record in his senior season.

References

External links
 

1889 births
1969 deaths
American football quarterbacks
Hastings Broncos football coaches
Nebraska Cornhuskers football players